Iselin Bank is a submarine bank in the Ross Sea off Antarctica. The name was approved by the Advisory Committee for Undersea Features in April 1980.

See also
Bowers Canyon

References

Undersea banks of the Southern Ocean